For the Record is a Canadian comedy-drama web series, which premiered in 2020 on CBC Gem. Created by Julian De Zotti, the six-episode anthology series centres on the emotional role of music in people's lives, with each episode focusing on a character facing a significant personal moment and the song that soundtracks it.

The cast includes De Zotti, Lisa Baylin, Anna Hopkins, Karen LeBlanc, Kira Clavell, Maurice Dean Wint, Moni Ogunsuyi, Theresa Tova, Phil Borg, Lyriq Bent, Alexandra Beaton, Uni Park, Johnny Orlando, Melissa McNerney, Justine Nelson, Alannah Ong, Brynn Chamblee, Tashi Simmons and Neil Lu.

The series was originally produced for CTV's planned Snackable web service, but moved to CBC Gem after Snackable was shelved.

The French firm Mediawan purchased international distribution rights to the series.

Awards

References

External links

2020 web series debuts
2020 Canadian television series debuts
2020s Canadian comedy-drama television series
Canadian comedy-drama web series
CBC Gem original programming